Maxim Alexandrovich Dlugy (born January 29, 1966) is an American chess player with the FIDE title of Grandmaster.

He was born in Moscow, USSR, and arrived with his family in the United States in 1977. He was awarded the International Master title in 1982. He won the World Junior Chess Championship in 1985. He was awarded the Grandmaster title in 1986 for his result at the World Chess Olympiad in Dubai, United Arab Emirates. At this event, he played on the U.S. team, which was in first place going into the last round. Always a strong speed chess player, Dlugy was formerly ranked number one in the world by the World Blitz Chess Association.

Chess career 
In 1984, he finished 3rd in the U.S. Chess Championship. He was 2nd in New York 1985, 2nd in Clichy 1986–87 and 3rd in the 1987 U.S. Chess Championship. He graduated from the Dalton School in New York City in 1984.

He was elected president of the United States Chess Federation in 1990.

Dlugy was the first chess grandmaster hired by IBM to work on the Deep Blue chess computer project, in 1990.

In March 2006, after returning to the U.S., Dlugy received a special invitation to play in the U.S. Chess Championship in San Diego, California. He achieved a plus score.

Dlugy was one of the campaign managers along with Garry Kasparov for Anatoly Karpov when he ran for FIDE President in Khanty-Mansiysk, Siberia, in 2010.

Dlugy operates Chess Max Academy, a chess school with locations in New York City and Connecticut.

In 2013, Dlugy helped investigate a cheating scandal involving Bulgarian FM Borislav Ivanov, who according to Dlugy was a using a device in his shoe that signaled him what moves to make. Ivanov was subsequently banned by the Bulgarian Chess Federation.

On two separate occasions in 2017 and 2020, Dlugy was suspected of, and later admitted to, having cheated himself in a Titled Tuesday online tournament run by Chess.com. The incident received renewed attention after Magnus Carlsen referenced it during the Carlsen–Niemann controversy, claiming that Dlugy had previously served as a coach of Hans Niemann. Later, Vice published an article where chess.com released e-mails showing that Dlugy had confessed to cheating multiple times on chess.com and had to be banned entirely from all events with cash prizes. On October 10, 2022, Dlugy made a lengthy statement denying that he had done any actual cheating, defending Niemann, and denying any involvement with Niemann's game.  Niemann has denied that Dlugy was ever his mentor.

Personal life 
Dlugy worked on Wall Street. He became a principal of the Russian Growth Fund, a hedge fund. Former world chess champion Garry Kasparov was formerly associated with Dlugy's Russian Growth Fund.

Dlugy was imprisoned in Russia in April 2005 on charges of embezzlement, but he was acquitted and freed later that year.

References

External links 
 
 
 
 
 
 

1966 births
Living people
American chess players
Russian chess players
Jewish chess players
Chess grandmasters
Chess officials
World Junior Chess Champions
American people of Russian-Jewish descent
Soviet emigrants to the United States
Russian Jews
Dalton School alumni